The URZ AP (Univerzální Ruční Zbraň Automatická Puška) is an assault rifle of Czechoslovak origin.

Development
The “series of weapons” concept was first pioneered by the French with the Berthier machine rifle and the Stoner 63 was developed by Jiri Cermak in the late 1960s, who also designed the SA Vz. 58 rifle. The weapons series was to replace everything from submachine guns to general purpose machine guns. The URZ APT used the receiver, which in all variants were belt-fed from a cylindrical container. Most unusual for a Warsaw Pact country, the URZ AP was chambered in 7.62×51mm NATO as it was intended for export.

The URZ AP is a 7.62×51mm NATO calibre delayed blowback assault rifle. The weapon uses a rotating bolt delayed blowback operation with 2 lugs with rollers to overcome a quarter twist to accelerate the bolt carrier and unlock. To ease extraction, the barrel has a fluted chamber to prevent ruptured cartridges. The select fire capability fires from closed bolt in semi auto and open bolt in full auto. The belt feed uses a feeding rotor found in the ammo box.

References

 L. Popelínský, Československé automatické zbraně a jejich tvůrci
 Little, Joseph; URZ - CZECHOSLOVAKIAN WEAPONS SYSTEM; FROM'75 (Notebook), no. 2, year 19, str. 6-7.
URZ AP

Assault rifles of Czechoslovakia
7.62×51mm NATO rifles
Trial and research firearms of Czechoslovakia